Lee Roy West (November 26, 1929 – April 24, 2020) was a United States district judge of the United States District Court for the Western District of Oklahoma.

Education and career

Born in Clayton, Oklahoma, West received a Bachelor of Arts degree from the University of Oklahoma in 1952, and was a lieutenant in the United States Marine Corps during the Korean War, from 1952 to 1956 (in active service from 1952 to 1954). West received a Juris Doctor from the University of Oklahoma College of Law in 1956, and a Master of Laws from Harvard Law School in 1963. He was in private practice in Ada, Oklahoma, from 1956 to 1961 and from 1963 to 1965, serving on the faculty of the University of Oklahoma College of Law from 1961 to 1962, and as a Ford Foundation Fellow in law teaching at Harvard Law School from 1962 to 1963. West was an Oklahoma District Judge for the 22nd Judicial District from 1965 to 1973, and was a Special Justice of the Oklahoma Supreme Court and Court of Criminal Appeals from 1965 to 1973. He was a member of the Civil Aeronautics Board from 1973 to 1978, serving as acting Chairman in 1977. He was in private practice in Tulsa, Oklahoma from 1978 to 1979.
On January 23, 1994, Judge Wests daughter, Jennifer Lee West, shot her neighbor in the face with a 9mm pistol and later pled guilty before Oklahoma County District Judge Nancy Coats to a lesser charge of assault with a deadly weapon. She had been charged with assault with intent to kill.

Federal judicial service

On September 28, 1979, West was nominated by President Jimmy Carter to a new seat on the United States District Court for the Western District of Oklahoma created by 92 Stat. 1629. He was confirmed by the United States Senate on October 31, 1979, and received his commission on November 2, 1979. He served as Chief Judge from 1993 to 1994, assuming senior status on November 26, 1994. He died on April 24, 2020, aged 90 in Muskogee, Oklahoma.

References

External links
 
Voices of Oklahoma interview with Lee Roy West First person interview conducted on April 27, 2011, with Lee Roy West.

1929 births
2020 deaths
Justices of the Oklahoma Supreme Court
Judges of the United States District Court for the Western District of Oklahoma
United States district court judges appointed by Jimmy Carter
20th-century American judges
United States Marine Corps officers
People from Ada, Oklahoma
People from Pushmataha County, Oklahoma
Military personnel from Oklahoma
Harvard Law School alumni
Ford Foundation fellowships
University of Oklahoma faculty
University of Oklahoma alumni
21st-century American judges